The Ford C4 is a three-speed, medium-duty automatic transmission introduced on 1964 model year vehicles and produced through 1981. The C4 was designed to be a lighter and simpler replacement for the original Ford-O-Matic two speed transmission being used in smaller, less powerful cars.

Ford used the term "SelectShift" because in the first C4's, placing the gear selector in D2 forced the transmission to start in second gear and then shift to third gear. If the transmission was placed in D1, the transmission would start in first gear, then shift to second and third gear as normal. If the gear selector was placed into L, the transmission stayed in first gear only. The shifter display appeared as P-R-N-D2-D1-L. Because this was confusing, later versions of the C4 were changed to a P-R-N-D-2-1 (or L) pattern typically seen today.

Because of its cast iron construction, the Ford-O-Matic was very heavy.  In designing the C4, Ford used an aluminum alloy, three-piece case (bell housing, main case, and tailhousing).  The aluminum case and the use of a simpler Simpson planetary gearset reduced the weight significantly. It was primarily used with Ford's inline six-cylinder engines and small V8 engines (see Ford small block engines), usually up to 302 in³ (5.0 L).  By comparison, the 351 Windsor and 351 Cleveland small and intermediate-block engines were backed by the medium-duty FMX or the heavy-duty C6 that debuted in 1966. Some C4s were built with a larger spread bell housing to use with 351M V8s, but these are rare. A few were also used with FE engines, mostly the 390 in full-size cars. Ratios are 2.46 low, 1.46 second and direct high. 

The early model C4 (1964–1969) used a .788-inch 24-spline input shaft, which was upgraded in 1970 to 26-spline and .839-inch.  The upgrade also included a matching 26-spline clutch hub.  In 1971, Ford went to a 26/24-spline input shaft, meaning the torque-converter side is 26-spline and the clutch hub is 24-spline.

The C4 was also found with valve bodies requiring a different number of bolts, 8-bolt vs 9-bolt.  A 9-bolt valve body can be used in either case, but a nut & bolt must be used on the valve body in the empty hole, dropping the bolt in from the top and using the nut on the bottom/filter side.

Modified C4s remain popular with hot rodders and drag racers due to their simplicity and durability.

Year & Model breakdown:
 1964–1966 Select Shift, 24/24 spline, castings: C4, C5, C6
 1967–1969 Select Shift, 24/24 spline, castings: C7, C8, C9
 1970–1970 Select Shift, 26/26 spline, castings: D0
 1971–1979 Select Shift, 26/24 spline, castings: D1, D2, D3, D4, D5, D6, D7, D8, D9

Applications:
 1973–1977 Ford Bronco
 1974–1982 Ford Cortina
1964-1967 Ford Econoline and Falcon Vans
 1965–1983 Ford F-Series
 1964–1970 Ford Fairlane
 1978–1983 Ford Fairmont
 1965–1970 Ford Falcon
 1975–1982 Ford Granada
 1975–1980 Ford LTD
 1970–1977 Ford Maverick
 1965–1981 Ford Mustang
 1971–1980 Ford Pinto
 1965–1979 Ford Ranchero
 1968–1981 Ford Thunderbird
 1968–1976 Ford Torino
 1964–1981 Lincolns
 1977–1980 Lincoln Versailles
 1974–1980 Mercury Bobcat
 1972–1981 Mercury Capri
 1964–1977 Mercury Comet
 1967–1981 Mercury Cougar
 1975–1980 Mercury Monarch
 1968–1976 Mercury Montego
 1978–1981 Mercury Zephyr

C5

As fuel economy became more important in the 1970s, and 1980s, the C4 was replaced in 1982 by the C5, which was essentially a C4 with a lock-up clutch in the torque converter to improve highway fuel economy.  It bore the casting numbers E2, E3, E4, E5, and E6, corresponding with the year it was produced.  The C5 was phased out in 1986, replaced by the AOD.  The production plant in Sharonville, Ohio was converted to production of the C6 transmission which was relocated from Livonia, Michigan, as the Livonia facility was converted to the AOD.

Applications:
 1986 Ford Aerostar
 1983–1986 Ford Ranger
 1983–1985 Ford Bronco II
 1983–1986 Ford LTD
 1982–1986 Ford Thunderbird
 1982–1986 Mercury Capri
 1982–1986 Mercury Cougar
 1983–1986 Mercury Marquis
 1983 Mercury Zephyr

C4